One of Our Girls is a lost 1914 silent film drama directed by Thomas N. Heffron and starring Hazel Dawn. It was adapted from the play of the same name by Bronson Howard and was produced by Famous Players Film Company and Daniel Frohman.

Cast
Hazel Dawn - Kate Shipley
Hal Clarendon - Comte Florian de Crebellon
Lionel Adams - Captain John Gregory
Fania Marinoff - Julie Fonblanque
Camilla Dalberg - Mme. Fonblanque
Charles Krauss - M. Fonblanque
David Powell M. Henri de St. Hillaire
George Backus - Dr. Girodet
Clarence Handyside - Mr. Shipley
Rolinda Bainbridge - Sylvia de Crebillon

References

External links
 One of Our Girls at IMDb.com

1914 films
American silent feature films
Lost American films
Famous Players-Lasky films
American black-and-white films
Silent American drama films
1914 drama films
1914 lost films
Lost drama films
1910s American films